Lachnocnema bibulus, the common woolly legs, is a butterfly of the family Lycaenidae. It is found in Sub-Saharan Africa. In South Africa it is found from the East Cape to KwaZulu-Natal, Eswatini, Mpumalanga, Gauteng, the Limpopo Province, and the North West Province.

The wingspan is 21–27 mm for males and 21–30.5 mm for females. Adults are on wing year-round in warmer areas with peaks in spring and late summer.

The larvae feed on Psyllidae plant lice species.

References

External links

Seitz, A. Die Gross-Schmetterlinge der Erde 13: Die Afrikanischen Tagfalter. Plate XIII 65 g

Butterflies described in 1793
Miletinae
Taxa named by Johan Christian Fabricius